South African born Trevyn McDowell is a former actress and a property developer,  who has starred in films, television programmes, theatre and radio, predominantly in her adopted homeland of England.

She appeared in the 1994 film Mary Shelley's Frankenstein and was Rosamund Vincy in Middlemarch. She is also well known for her portrayal of Michelle Hauptmann in Capital City a 1989 television series produced by Euston Films which focused on the professional and personal lives of a group of investment bankers working on the corporate trading floor of Shane-Longman, a fictional international bank based in the City of London.

External links

References

Living people
1967 births
20th-century South African actresses
21st-century South African actresses
Actresses from Johannesburg
South African film actresses
South African stage actresses
South African television actresses